Mount Airy is an unincorporated community in Randolph County, in the U.S. state of Missouri.

History
Variant names were "Mountairy" and "Uptonsville". A post office called Mount Airy was established in 1831, and remained in operation until 1902.

References

Unincorporated communities in Randolph County, Missouri
Unincorporated communities in Missouri